Kharg or Khark Island is a continental island in the Persian Gulf belonging to Iran. Administered by the adjacent coastal Bushehr Province, Khark Island provides a sea port for the export of oil and extends Iranian territorial sea claims into the Persian Gulf oil fields. Located on Khark Island is Khark, the only city in the Khark District.

History

Mentioned in the Hudud al-'Alam as a good source for pearls around 982 AD, Khark was visited by the French traveller Jean de Thévenot in 1665, who recorded trade at the time with Isfahan and Basra. In 1753 the Dutch Empire established both a trading post and a fort on the island after securing perpetual ownership of the island from Mir Nasáir, the Arab ruler of Bandar Rig, in return for a present of 2000 rupees. In 1766 the Dutch fort was captured by Mir Mahanna, the governor of Bandar Rig.

The island was briefly occupied in 1838 by the British to block the Siege of Herat (1838) but was soon returned. Amoco built and operated the oil terminal on the island. Its property was expropriated after the revolution.

Once the world's largest offshore crude oil terminal and the principal sea terminal for Iranian oil, the Khark Island facilities were put out of commission in the fall of 1986. Heavy bombing of the Khark Island facilities from 1980 through 1988 by the Iraqi Air Force during the Iran–Iraq War all but destroyed most of the terminal facilities. Khark Island was situated in the middle of the Darius Oilfield, also destroyed by the intensive bombing. Repair to all facilities has been very slow, even after the war ended in 1988.  The events experienced by this island gave rise to the dispute in the English contract law case The Kanchenjunga [1990] 1 Lloyd's Rep 391, regarding the conditions for repudiatory breach of contract and a claimant's right to elect to accept repudiation.

In 2009, Iran exported and swapped 950 million barrels of crude oil via southern Khark oil terminal.

Archaeology

The first archaeological evidence of human occupation on Khark island was reported by Captain A. W. Stiffe in 1898, with studies published about his discoveries by F. Sarre and E. Herzfeld in 1910. They discovered two rock-cut chambered tombs featuring arched entranceways to a main chamber with vestibule from which spawned around twenty smaller chambers. Mary-Joseph Steve has argued that the architecture of the tombs is more reminiscent of Nabataean architecture at Petra than anything Palmyrene.

Another eighty three rock cut tombs and sixty two megalithic tombs have been studied on Kharg. The rock-cut tombs fall into four categories; single chambered, shallow tombs of varying shape, pit burials and excavated multi-chambered complexes. Steve also noticed the presence of several Nestorian style crosses at some of the tombs.

There are also ruins of a coarse stone temple on the island measuring around  square with a plastered altar for fire in the centre.

Achaemenid inscription 

On November 14, 2007, a cuneiform inscription dating back to Achaemenid era was discovered on Kharg Island in Old Persian.  The inscription is carved on a coral rock in Old Persian semi-syllabic cuneiform signs. Despite the usually well-ordered regular system of Achaemenid inscriptions, this one is in an unusual order written in five lines.

The linguist Habib Borjian explains that if the inscription is authentic, combined with the island's known history of kariz usage, "which came about under the Achaemenid rule in the Near East (550–330 BCE)", it can be suggested that there was a Persian colonisation of Kharg under the Achaemenids. The Iranian dialect of the Persian settlers of the Achaemenid period may have in turn been the ancestor of the Khargi language, with Borjian adding that "there is no contradicting evidence to make this hypothesis implausible".

On May 31, 2008, the inscription was seriously damaged by unknown vandal(s). They destroyed it with a sharp object, such that about 70 percent of the inscription was seriously damaged. The nature of the damage indicates that it was done deliberately.

The 17th-century French traveller Jean de Thévenot noted the presence of qanat (i.e. kariz) on the island that would have provided ancient irrigation.

In popular culture 
The island appears with a SAM radar installation on it in the Sega Genesis flight simulator F-15 Strike Eagle II in the Persian Gulf mission map.

The island is featured as a playable map in DICE's Battlefield 3 video game, having some resemblance to the real island.

It also appears in Delta Force: Black Hawk Down – Team Sabre.

See also 

 List of lighthouses in Iran

References

Megalithic monuments in the Middle East
Islands of Iran
Bushehr County
Islands of the Persian Gulf
Archaeological sites in Iran
Landforms of Bushehr Province